Miss Honduras or Miss Honduras Universe (also, known as Señorita Honduras) is a national beauty pageant in Honduras. The pageant was founded in 1930, where the winners were sent to Miss Universe.

History
The first edition of Miss Honduras began in 1930. The winner in that year was giving to Angélica Meza Milla on July 27, 1930. The second edition was started in 1954 by Ministry of Tourism Honduras. In 1954 Liliam Padilla was crowning as the first Miss Honduras after many years in 1930.

In 1965 Eda Inés Munguía of Tegucigalpa won Señorita Honduras 1965 in under Doña Norma de Funes directorship. In that year the main winner competed at the Miss World while Honduras did not compete at the Miss Universe between 1956 and 1966. Began in 1967 the main winner returned to participate at the Miss Universe competition.

In 1996 Eduardo Zablah took the national pageant of Señorita Honduras and was renaming as Señorita Honduras Universe Inc. He also took the franchise of Miss World and Miss International for the runners-up.

Between 2003 and 2006 there is no Miss Honduras national contest. Dania Patricia Prince Méndezen, Miss Honduras 1998 was selected as Miss Honduras Tierra in 2003 by another agency which unrelated to the main Miss Honduras Organization. Dania is the only one grand slam winner from Honduras who won Miss Earth 2003 in the Philippines.

In 2007 A Puerto Rican citizen, Carlos Rivera took the franchise of Miss Universe Organization under Donald Trump. He also signed up other franchises like Miss Earth and Miss United Continents at Miss Honduras Organization. The first winner of Miss Honduras after four years absent was Wendy Patricia Salgado Corea. Meanwhile Miss World and Miss International select from another agency which calls as now Señorita Honduras World or Miss World Honduras directed by Eduardo Zablah.

In 2016 Carlos Rivera, Bryan Espinoza, Ricardo Caballero appointed to be the new President of Miss Honduras Organization. He owns the committee of ICA (Independencia Centro America).

Editions
Miss Honduras contest traditionally holds in Tegucigalpa, M.D.C. at Convenciones del Hotel Honduras Maya, Teatro Nacional Manuel Bonilla and Country Club. In some years the contest also holds at Casino Sampedrano, Campo de la Asociación de Ganaderos y Agricultores (AGAS) and Confetis Discoteque.

Titleholders
The following women have represented Honduras in the Big Four international beauty pageants, the four major international beauty pageants for women. These are Miss World, Miss Universe, Miss International and Miss Earth.

Titleholders under Miss Honduras org.

Miss Honduras Universe

The Winner of Miss Honduras represents the country at the Miss Universe pageant. If the winner will resign the title, the runner-up will take over the crown.

Señorita Honduras Mundo

Prior to 2008 a Runner-up or sometimes winner of Miss Honduras went to Miss World pageant. Began 2008 the winner of Señorita Honduras Mundo in under Eduardo Zablah represents her country at the Miss World pageant.

Señorita Honduras Internacional

Prior to 2009 a Runner-up or sometimes winner of Miss Honduras went to Miss International pageant. Began in 2009 the Señorita Honduras Internacional winner in under Eduardo Zablah represents her country at the Miss International pageant.

Miss Earth Honduras

The Señorita Honduras Tierra winner in under Eduardo Zablah represented her country at the Miss Earth pageant. Before creating the pageant the first runner-up of Miss Honduras or winner competed at the Miss Earth pageant between 2007 and 2012. Today the Miss Earth Honduras is holding by Miss Earth Honduras.

See also

References

External links
misshondurashonduras
misshondurasmundo

Beauty pageants in Honduras
Honduras
Honduras
Honduras
Honduras
Recurring events established in 1930